Jazz Caper is an album by saxophonist Bill Barron which was recorded in 1978 and first released on the Muse label in 1982.

Reception 

In his review on Allmusic, Scott Yanow called it "Intriguing music that rewards repeated listenings"

Track listing 
All compositions by Bill Barron except where noted.
 "Jazz Caper" – 7:25
 "Spring Thing" – 7:25
 "Until Further Notice" – 5:31
 "New Love" (Bill Barron, J. Jarrett) – 4:03
 "One For Bird" – 8:09
 "Hoppin' and Skippin'" – 6:08
 "Flip Flop" – 6:41

Personnel 
Bill Barron – tenor saxophone, soprano saxophone
Jimmy Owens – trumpet
Kenny Barron – piano
Buster Williams – bass
Ed Blackwell – drums

References 

1982 albums
Muse Records albums
Bill Barron (musician) albums